is an ethnic township of Luoyuan County, Fuzhou, Fujian province, China.

Administrative divisions 
 is divided into 24 administrative villages.

Gallery

See also 
 List of township-level divisions of Fujian

References 

Coordinates on Wikidata
Fuzhou
Township-level divisions of Fujian
She ethnic townships